Enak Ferlemann (born 12 July 1963) is a German politician of the Christian Democratic Union (CDU) who has been serving as a member of the Bundestag since 2002.

Early life and education
Ferlemann was born 1963 in the West German town of Bad Rothenfelde and studied jurisprudence without gaining a degree.

Political career
Ferlemann entered the CDU in 1979 and became chairman of the county party organisation in Cuxhaven in 1995.

Ferlemann has been a member of the Bundestag since the 2002 elections, representing the Cuxhaven – Stade II constituency. In parliament, he served on the Committee on Transport, where he focused on the construction of Bundesautobahn 26 and the expansion of Bundesautobahn 20. From 2005 until 2009, he chaired the Sub-Committee on Railway Infrastructure.

In the negotiations to form a coalition government of the Christian Democrats and the FDP following the 2009 federal elections, Ferlemann was part of the CDU/CSU delegation in the working group on transport policy, led by Hans-Peter Friedrich and Patrick Döring.

Since the 2009 elections, Ferlemann has been serving as Parliamentary State Secretary in the Federal Ministry of Transport and Digital Infrastructure under the leadership of successive ministers Peter Ramsauer (2009-2013), Alexander Dobrindt (2013-2017) and Andreas Scheuer (since 2018) in the government of Chancellor Angela Merkel. In this capacity, he also served as the Federal Commissioner for Rail Transport from 2018 until 2021.

In the negotiations to form a coalition government under the leadership of Chancellor Angela Merkel following the 2017 federal elections, Ferlemann was part of the working group on transport and infrastructure, led by Michael Kretschmer, Alexander Dobrindt and Sören Bartol.

References

1963 births
Living people
Members of the Bundestag for Lower Saxony
Members of the Bundestag 2021–2025
Members of the Bundestag 2017–2021
Members of the Bundestag 2013–2017
Members of the Bundestag 2009–2013
Members of the Bundestag 2005–2009
Members of the Bundestag 2002–2005
Parliamentary State Secretaries of Germany
Members of the Bundestag for the Christian Democratic Union of Germany